The Taiwanese Ambassador to Honduras is the official representative of the Republic of China to the Republic of Honduras.

History
 In 1957 a legation was established in Tegucigalpa.
 On May 20, 1965, the diplomatic status of the Legation was elevated to that of an embassy.

List of representatives

References 

Honduras
China